Saanich is a district municipality on Vancouver Island in British Columbia, within the Greater Victoria area. The population was 117,735 at the 2021 census, making it the most populous municipality in the Capital Regional District and Vancouver Island, and the eighth-most populous in the province. The district adopted its name after the Saanich First Nation, meaning "emerging land" or "emerging people". The District acts as a bedroom community immediately to the north of Victoria, British Columbia.

The municipality contains a wide variety of rural and urban landscapes and neighbourhoods stretching north to the Saanich Peninsula. Saanich is home to part of the University of Victoria which is bisected by the neighbouring district municipality of Oak Bay and to both campuses of Camosun College. The municipality's topography is undulating with many glacially scoured rock outcroppings. The physical setting is greatly influenced by water.

History
Saanich has been the home to First Nations people for thousands of years. Saanich is on the territory of the Lək̓ʷəŋən peoples known today as Songhees & Esquimalt Nations, the Malahat Nation and the Saanich Peoples. These Indigenous peoples have connections to the land and those traditions are carried on to this day. Non-Indigenous history begins with the arrival of the Hudson's Bay Company in the 1840s.

The Craigflower Schoolhouse (originally called Maple Point School), the oldest surviving school building in Western Canada, was built on orders from Kenneth MacKenzie. He came from Scotland with his family in 1852, on the Hudson's Bay Company ship Norman Morison, to establish a farm for the Puget Sound Agricultural Company, a subsidiary of the Hudson's Bay Company. A school was needed for the children of farm employees, as well as those of arriving settlers.

The Municipality of Saanich was incorporated on March 1, 1906. The Dominion Astrophysical Observatory telescope was designed by John Stanley Plaskett, an astronomer with the Department of the Interior in Ottawa. The  reflecting telescope was the largest of its kind in the world when it was built, though this was only the case for a few short months in 1918.

The District of Saanich contains a long shoreline with sandy beaches located at several ocean bays. Two of the beaches are Cadboro Bay Beach and Cordova Bay Beach. Cadboro Bay is known as the home of the "Cadborosaurus", a mythical cryptid. Saanich's notable parks include Mount Douglas Park, Mount Tolmie Park (with viewpoints), and Gyro Park.

W̱SÁNEĆ peoples

Groups
The W̱SÁNEĆ (weh-saanich) peoples are represented by the Tsartlip (Sart-Lip), Pauquachin (Paw-Qua-Chin), Tsawout (Say-Out), Tseycum (Sigh-Come) and Malahat (Mal-a-hat) Nations. The W̱SÁNEĆ  Leadership Council Society consists of three of theses Nations: Tsartlip, Tseycum and Tsawout. These W̱SÁNEĆ First Nations remain on their ancestral lands and continue to prosper today.

Leadership Council 
On May 7, 2018, the W̱SÁNEĆ Leadership Council was created as a representation of the W̱SÁNEĆ First Nations to the Government. The creation of this council not only brought three Indigenous groups together, but it also established a legal governing body. With this council, came many proposals and projects to benefit the W̱SÁNEĆ First Nations.

Includes:
January 2018, the submission of a proposal for the Government of Canada to make the council a legal governing body (accepted).
Submission of funding to the federal government's "National Rebuilding" program.
Negotiations of a government to government project with the Capital Regional District.

Language 
The W̱SÁNEĆ language or Saanich dialect is called SENĆOŦEN  This dialect was revitalized by the late John Elliot, an important member of the W̱SÁNEĆ community and peoples.

Climate

Government
The Saanich District Council is the governing body of the municipality of Saanich. The council consists of the Mayor and eight councillors.
Mayor: Dean Murdock
Councillors: Colin Plant, Susan Brice, Zac de Vries, Judy Brownoff, Mena Westhaver, Nathalie Chambers, Karen Harper, & Teale Phelps Bondaroff

Neighbourhoods

Saanich is divided into twelve local areas for planning purposes. In addition, there are a number of community associations in the municipality that represent neighbourhoods largely overlapping with the local areas. The Local Areas, and representative community associations, are listed below:

 Blenkinsop. A primarily rural community in a valley situated west of Mount Douglas. Represented by the Blenkinsop Valley Community Association.
 Cadboro Bay. A small village located at the eastern edge of Saanich, bordering on Oak Bay near the University of Victoria. The community also includes the upscale waterfront neighbourhood of Ten Mile Point. Represented by the Cadboro Bay Residents' Association.
 Carey. A suburban community located in western Saanich. Represented by the Residents Association of Strawberry Vale, Marigold and Glanford in the north, and the Mount View Colquitz Community Association in the south.
 Broadmead. Originally developed from Broadmead Farms, it was designed as an architecturally controlled area. The focus of the development was to incorporate homes into the landscape. Large trees could not be cut down to accommodate the homes. Most of the area is considered to be in an urban forest. It is situated near Highway 17 and ends a few blocks west of Cordova Bay Road. The community is represented by the Broadmead Area Residents' Association, BARA.
 Cordova Bay. A seaside community in northern Saanich. Represented by the Cordova Bay Association for Community Affairs.
 Gordon Head. A large suburban community to the north of the University of Victoria. Represented by the Gordon Head Residents' Association.
 North Quadra. A suburban community in the centre of the municipality. Represented by the North Quadra Community Association.
 Quadra. A large urban and suburban community surrounding the urban core of Saanich. Contains the Cedar Hill Golf Course and is represented by the Quadra Cedar Hill Community Association.
 Royal Oak. A suburban community at the rural edge of Saanich. Represented by the Royal Oak Community Association, Falaise Community Association, and the Broadmead Area Residents' Association.
 Rural Saanich. The largest Local Area by area, this part of Saanich is sparsely populated and mostly rural. Represented in part by the Prospect Lake and District Community Association.
 Saanich Core. The urban centre of the District of Saanich. Contains Uptown and the municipal hall. Represented by part of the Mount View Community Association and part of the Quadra Cedar Hill Community Association.
 Shelbourne. An urban and suburban community stretching between the City of Victoria and the University of Victoria. Represented by the Mount Tolmie Community Association and Camosun Community Association.
 Tillicum. An urban and suburban community along the Gorge in western Saanich. Represented by the Gorge Tillicum Community Association.

Education
The northeastern half of British Columbia's third-largest university, the University of Victoria campus, is in Saanich, while the southwestern portion is in neighbouring Oak Bay. Saanich is also home to both major campuses of Camosun College, the original Lansdowne campus, and the Interurban campus.

Saanich is divided between two bordering school districts, School District 61 Greater Victoria and School District 63 Saanich. It is also the home of South Island Distance Education School.

Demographics

Ethnicity 

Note: Totals greater than 100% due to multiple origin responses.

Religion 
According to the 2021 census, religious groups in Saanich included:
Irreligion (66,460 persons or 57.5%)
Christianity (38,645 persons or 33.5%)
Sikhism (3,250 persons or 2.8%)
Islam (1,855 persons or 1.6%)
Buddhism (1,520 persons or 1.3%)
Hinduism (1,370 persons or 1.2%)
Judaism (760 persons or 0.7%)
Indigenous spirituality (100 persons or 0.1%)

Surrounding municipalities and communities

See also 
 Elk/Beaver Lake Regional Park
 Murder of Reena Virk

Notes

References

External links

 
Saanich Peninsula
District municipalities in British Columbia
Greater Victoria